William Brewer (1811 – 3 November 1881) was a British Liberal Party politician.

Brewer first stood for election at Colchester at a by-election in 1867 but was successful. He was then elected MP for the seat in 1868 but lost the seat at the next election in 1874.

From 18 January 1878 to his death, Brewer was also a member of the Metropolitan Board of Works for the Vestry of St George Hanover Square.

References

External links
 

Liberal Party (UK) MPs for English constituencies
UK MPs 1868–1874
1811 births
1881 deaths